Pons (de) Santolh was a thirteenth-century troubadour, probably a member of the Centulli family, but whether of the Castelsarrasin or Toulouse branch remains a mystery. He was a brother of the wife of Guilhem de Montanhagol. He composed a planh, "Marritz com oms mal sabens ab frachura", on his brother-in-law's death.

References
Anglade, Joseph (1928). Les troubadours de Toulouse. Toulouse: Privat.

13th-century French troubadours
Year of birth unknown
Year of death unknown